The 2015 American Athletic Conference Football Championship Game was held on December 5, 2015 at 11:00 a.m. Central Time at TDECU Stadium in Houston, Texas.  The first football championship game for The American, it was hosted by the Houston Cougars, West Division champion, and featured the Temple Owls, East Division champion. It was broadcast on ABC.

Teams

Houston

The Houston Cougars football team is a member of the American Athletic Conference in its West Division. They finished the season 13–1, 7–1 in American Athletic play to win a share of the West Division title. Due to their head to head win over Navy, they represented the West Division in the inaugural American Athletic Championship Game. This was their first conference championship game since 2011, when they were Conference USA. They were aiming for their first conference championship since 2006.

Temple

The Temple Owls were members of the East Division of the American Athletic Conference. They finished the season 10–4, 7–1 in American Athletic Conference play to finish as champions of the East Division. This was their first division title since 2009, when they tied with Ohio for the MAC West title. They represented the East Division in the American Athletic Championship Game. The Owls were aiming for their first conference title since winning the Middle Atlantic Conference in 1967 and their first major conference title in school history.

Game summary

Source:

Statistics

References

Championship
American Athletic Conference Football Championship Game
Houston Cougars football games
Temple Owls football games
American football competitions in Houston
American Athletic Conference Football Championship Game
American Athletic Conference Football Championship Game
American Athletic Conference Football Championship Game